OKN may refer to:

OKN, the IATA code for Okondja Airport, an airport in Okondja, Gabon
OKN, the National Rail code for Oakengates railway station, Shropshire, England